Vice-Admiral Angus Topshee,  is a Royal Canadian Navy officer and Commander of the Royal Canadian Navy.

Naval career
Topshee joined the Canadian Armed Forces in 1990 and graduated from the Royal Military College of Canada in 1994. He was given command of the destroyer, HMCS Algonquin in July 2009 and was then deployed to Afghanistan as Director of Afghan National Police Training Operations in 2011. He went on to be Director of Operations for Exercise RIMPAC in 2012, commander of CFB Halifax in late 2012 and deputy director of the Strategy, Policy and Plans Directorate at North American Aerospace Defense Command in 2015. After that he became commander of the Canadian Fleet Pacific in July 2018, commander of Maritime Forces Pacific in May 2021 and Commander of the Royal Canadian Navy in May 2022.

Topshee was awarded the Meritorious Service Medal on 19 December 2013, and appointed an Officer of the Order of Military Merit on 12 October 2017.

Awards and decorations
Topshee's personal awards and decorations include the following:
110px

25pxFile:CPSM Ribbon.png

File:CD-ribbon and 2 bars.png

 CDS Commendation

Notes

References

Living people
Canadian admirals
Commanders of the Royal Canadian Navy
Year of birth missing (living people)